Cyperus aterrimus is a species of sedge that is native to parts of Africa.

See also 
 List of Cyperus species

References 

aterrimus
Plants described in 1854
Flora of Tanzania
Flora of Kenya
Flora of Malawi
Flora of Burundi
Flora of Cameroon
Flora of Ethiopia
Flora of Rwanda
Flora of Uganda
Taxa named by Ernst Gottlieb von Steudel